Hinojosa de Duero is a village and large municipality in the province of Salamanca,  western Spain, part of the autonomous community of Castile-Leon.

Geography

Economy
The basis of the economy is agriculture. The village is also known for its local cheese ("queso de Hinojosa"), which is an aged cheese made with sheep milk, similar to Manchego.

Culture
The city celebrates the San Juan festival on 24 June.

See also
List of municipalities in Salamanca

References

Municipalities in the Province of Salamanca